Cyprus competed in the Eurovision Song Contest 2000, held on 13 May 2000 at the Globe Arena in Stockholm, Sweden. The Cyprus Broadcasting Corporation (CyBC) organised a public selection process to determine its entry for the contest. 11 songs competed in the national final, held on 16 February 2000, where a panel selected the winning song. The duo Voice, consisting of Christina Argyri and Alexandros Panayi, received the most votes with their song "Nomiza" and were selected to represent the nation in the contest. Voice performed 11th at the international contest and at the close of the voting process, finished in 21st place, receiving eight points.

Background

It then participated yearly, only missing the 1988 contest when its selected song "Thimame" by Yiannis Dimitrou was disqualified for being previously released. Cyprus' least successful result was in  when it placed last with the song "Tora zo" by Elpida, receiving only four points in total.

Before Eurovision

National final 
To select its entry for the Eurovision Song Contest 2000, CyBC hosted a national final on 16 February 2000 at the Nea Leoforos Nightclub in Limassol, hosted by Loukas Hamatsos. 11 songs competed with the winning song chosen by a 21-member jury, which included Eurovision 1999 winner Charlotte Nilsson and Lina Kawar who was a backing singer for Cyprus in Eurovision 1997 and 1999. The event was broadcast live via satellite as well as on the CyBC 2 television station and radio Channel 2. During the performance, Nilsson was also featured as a guest singer. At the close of voting, "Nomiza" performed by Christina Argyri and Alexandros Panayi received the most votes and was selected as the Cypriot entry.

At Eurovision
The Eurovision Song Contest 2000 took place at the Globe Arena in Stockholm, Sweden, on 13 May 2000. According to the Eurovision rules, the 24-country participant list for the contest was composed of: the winning country from the previous year's contest; the 18 countries, other than the previous year's winner, which had obtained the highest average number of points over the last five contests; and any countries which had not participated in the previous year's content. Cyprus was one of the 18 countries with the highest average scores, and thus were permitted to participate. The running order for the contest was decided by a draw; Cyprus was assigned position 11, following  and preceding . At the end of the voting, Cyprus received only 8 points, placing 21st in the field of 24 countries. Due to poor results, Cyprus was not permitted to take part in the 2001 Contest the next year; however, they were re-admitted for the following year. Thus, the song was succeeded as Cypriot representative at the 2002 Contest by One with "Gimme".

Voting
The same voting system in use since 1975 was again implemented for this event, with each country providing 1–8, 10 and 12 points to the ten highest-ranking songs as determined by a selected jury or the viewing public through televoting, with countries not allowed to vote for themselves. This was the third contest to feature widespread public voting, and Cyprus opted to implement this method to determine which countries would receive their points, with an 8-member back-up jury assembled in case technical failures rendered the telephone votes invalid. The Cypriot televoting awarded its 12 points to Russia.

References

Bibliography 

 

2000
Countries in the Eurovision Song Contest 2000
Eurovision